Bengali film means cinema in the Bengali language, mainly produced in Bangladesh and West Bengal (a state of India).

Bengali film may refer to:

 Cinema of Bangladesh
 Cinema of West Bengal